Anagrapha is a genus of moths of the family Noctuidae.

Species
 Anagrapha falcifera (Kirby, 1837)

References
 Anagrapha at Markku Savela's Lepidoptera and Some Other Life Forms
 Natural History Museum Lepidoptera genus database

Plusiinae
Noctuoidea genera